Heterocrossa epomiana is a species moth in the family Carposinidae. It is endemic to New Zealand.

Taxonomy
This species was described by Edward Meyrick in 1885 using a specimen he collected at Otira Gorge at an altitude of 1,600 ft in January. In 1922 Meyrick classified Heterocrossa as a synonym of the genus Carposina. George Hudson, in his 1928 publication The Butterflies and Moths of New Zealand, discusses this species as a synonym of Carposina gonosemana. In 1978 Elwood Zimmerman argued that the genus Heterocrassa  should not be a synonym of Carposina as the genitalia of the species within the genus Heterocrassa are distinctive. In 1988 John S. Dugdale assigned the species back to the genus Heterocrossa. The holotype specimen is held at the Natural History Museum, London.

This species is visually very similar to Heterocrossa gonosemana and to Heterocrossa philpotti.

Description
Meyrick described the species as follows:

Distribution 
This species is endemic to New Zealand. It has been collected in Westland.

Biology and behaviour 
This species is on the wing in January.

References

External links

Image of holotype specimen

Carposinidae
Moths of New Zealand
Moths described in 1885
Endemic fauna of New Zealand
Taxa named by Edward Meyrick
Endemic moths of New Zealand